KoreAm, or KoreAm Journal, was a monthly print magazine dedicated to news, commentary, politics, lifestyle and culture published in the United States. It was the oldest and most widely circulated English-language monthly magazine for the Asian American community. The magazine has featured prominent Asian American leaders, politicians, artists, entertainers, athletes and entrepreneurs. It also covered current events related to North Korea, South Korea, Asian Americans, immigrants and communities of color. The magazine ended print issue in December 2015.

In 2018, the publication relaunched as KORE magazine. In April 2019, KORE rebranded as Character Media.

History
KoreAm was founded by Jung Shig Ryu and James Ryu in 1990 in Los Angeles, California.

The magazine highlighted news, stories, op-ed pieces and entertainment for the Kyopo community - aka ethnic Koreans living overseas - primarily Koreans in the United States. The magazine highlighted Korean American perspectives on matters related to Korea, including North Korea's nuclear program, reunification, the six-party talks, the deaths of South Korean presidents, the globalization of South Korean pop culture, and peninsular tensions and conflicts. The magazine also addressed biracial and adoptee communities. KoreAm was the most widely circulated, longest-running, independent English-language publication serving the Korean American community.

Two years after KoreAm's founding, the magazine became a major forum for the Korean community relating to the 1992 Los Angeles riots. The riots caused violence, arson, looting and lawlessness. Korean-run businesses were targeted during what has been dubbed this nation's first "multiethnic riot."

KoreAm featured prominent Korean Americans on its cover. These stories included Margaret Cho, John Cho, Daniel Dae Kim, Jane Kim, and Michelle Rhee. Stories also included a profile on Pinkberry founder Shelly Hwang, a ground level feature on the Virginia Tech massacre, as well as packages on health care reform, education reform, gays in the military, and Korean Americans affected by Hurricane Katrina. 

In 2003, KoreAm launched a sister publication, Audrey Magazine. 

The magazine's official website was launched in 2009.

London Trust Media acquired the magazine in 2014. The magazine ceased publication in December 2015.

Staff

Editorial

Julie Ha, Editor-in-Chief  
Michelle Woo, Online Editor
Jiyoon Kim, Art Director

Marketing & Advertising

James Ryu, Publisher
Joyce Park, Marketing Director
Esther Kim, Operations Manager

Former Editors

Corina Knoll 
Jimmy Lee
John Lee
Kai Ma
Larry Tazuma

Publication history

1990

1991

1992

1993

1994

1995

1996

1997

1998

1999

2000

2001

2002

2003

2004

2005

2006

2007

2008

2009

2010

2011

2012

2013

2014

2015

Accolades

2000 

 Gay & Lesbian Alliance Against Defamation (GLAAD) Media Award nominee

2002 

 Outstanding Service on Behalf of the Korean American community presented by the Korean American Bar Association of Southern California
 Annual Community Service Award presented by the Korean American Coalition San Francisco Bay Area Chapter

2003 

 New California Media Awards: Arts/Culture.
 Pacific Asian Consortium in Employment (PACE) Setter Award

2004 

 New California Media Awards: International; Youth Voice; Workplace Issues/Economy; Investigative/In-depth (runner-up); Arts, Sports & Entertainment (runner-up)

2005 

 Society of Professional Journalists Mark of Excellence Awards, Region 5: Best Nonfiction Magazine Features.

2008 

 Asian Pacific American Community Award by United States Assembly member Ted Lieu

2009 

 National New America Media Award in the category of Best In-Depth and Investigative Reporting for Kai Ma's “To Have and to Hold,” a feature on Proposition 8 and the Korean American vote
 National New America Media Honorable Mention in the category of Arts, Sports & Entertainment for Kai Ma's “High Rollers,” a feature on high-stakes gambling.
 National New America Media Award in the category of Race and Interethnic Relations for Julie Ha's “Neighborhood Watch,” a feature on the large numbers of Koreans moving into the Los Angeles neighborhood known as Little Tokyo, one of the last Japantowns left in California.

2011 

 Korean Churches in Community Development (KCCD) Legacy Award

2013 

 Leadership Education for Asian Pacifics (LEAP) Leadership Award

References

External links

 https://web.archive.org/web/20100708064331/http://expo.newamericamedia.org/winners/best_in_depth_investigative_english
https://web.archive.org/web/20100717162419/http://expo.newamericamedia.org/winners/race_and_interethnic_relations
 KoreAm Website (iamKoreAm.com)
 Asian American Ethnic Media Survives Tough Times
 Online Editions (CharacterMedia.com)

Lifestyle magazines published in the United States
Monthly magazines published in the United States
Asian-American magazines
Defunct magazines published in the United States
Korean-American culture
Magazines established in 1990
Magazines disestablished in 2015
Magazines published in California